Garland Folsom Pinholster (February 19, 1928 – September 20, 2020) was an athletic director as well as college basketball, baseball, and tennis coach, elected to the Oglethorpe Athletic Hall of Fame in its inaugural year of 1962. He is also a member of the Georgia Sports Hall of Fame.

Early years
Pinholster was born in Clyattville, Georgia. He served in the United States Army and was commissioned a lieutenant. He was a basketball player for North Georgia College, a member of a team that won a state title in 1950.

Oglethorpe University
Pinholster most notably coached at Oglethorpe University from 1956 to 1966.

Basketball
He compiled a 181–67 record as a basketball coach. Pinholster developed the wheel offense, an offensive strategy developed in the late 1950s. It is a kind of continuity offense in which players move around in a circular pattern to create good scoring opportunities. The wheel offense is a popular offensive play, frequently used by teams from middle school to college levels because it can effectively work against any defense, including zone defense and man-to-man defense. He is one proposed inventor for the foul-line huddle. His teams were notable for their defense.

He wrote several books on the sport, including Coach's Guide to Modern Basketball Defense .

United States national basketball
He coached the United States men's national basketball team including a gold medal finish at the 1963 Pan American Games and fourth place finish in the 1963 FIBA World Championship. The 1963 team included Willis Reed. Former coach Gary Colson once said "Garland Pinholster, for a period of time, was the best coach in the United States."

Business
After his days at Oglethorpe, he became one of Atlanta's most successful business men.

Politics
Pinholster served in the Georgia House of Representatives from 1990 to 2002 and was a Republican. Pinholster became chairman of the minority caucus of the Georgia House of Representatives and was elected to the Georgia State Board of Transportation.

Death
He died on September 20, 2020, in Ball Ground, Georgia at age 92.

References

1928 births
2020 deaths
American men's basketball coaches
American tennis coaches
Basketball coaches from Georgia (U.S. state)
Basketball players from Georgia (U.S. state)
Businesspeople from Atlanta
Republican Party members of the Georgia House of Representatives
Military personnel from Georgia (U.S. state)
North Georgia Nighthawks men's basketball players
Oglethorpe Stormy Petrels baseball coaches
Oglethorpe Stormy Petrels men's basketball coaches
People from Lowndes County, Georgia
United States men's national basketball team coaches
United States Army officers